Events from the year 1923 in the United States.

Incumbents

Federal Government 
 President: Warren G. Harding (R-Ohio) (until August 2), Calvin Coolidge (R-Massachusetts) (starting August 2)
 Vice President: Calvin Coolidge (R-Massachusetts) (until August 2), vacant (starting August 2)
 Chief Justice: William Howard Taft (Ohio)
 Speaker of the House of Representatives: Frederick H. Gillett (R-Massachusetts)
 Senate Majority Leader: Henry Cabot Lodge (R-Massachusetts)
 Congress: 67th (until March 4), 68th (starting March 4)

Events

January–March
 January 1–7 – The Rosewood massacre, a racially motivated massacre of black people and the destruction of a black town, takes place in Rosewood, Florida.
 January 18 – Elon College's campus in North Carolina is destroyed by a fire.
February 5 – United States v. Bhagat Singh Thind: The Supreme Court decides that Bhagat Singh Thind cannot become a naturalized U.S. citizen because, as a Punjabi Sikh, he is not a "white person".
 February 23 – The American Law Institute is incorporated.
 March 1 – The USS Connecticut is decommissioned.
 March 2 – The first issue of Time magazine is published.
 March 23 – The governor of Oklahoma signs House Bill 197 with the Montgomery amendment outlawing the theory of evolution in public school textbooks purchased by the state, the first anti-Darwinian legislation passed in the U.S.

April–June
 April 1 – Safety Last!, a silent romantic comedy film starring Harold Lloyd, is released.
 April 4 – Warner Bros. Film Studio is formally incorporated in the United States, as Warner Brothers Pictures, Inc., by Jack L. Warner, Harry Warner, Sam Warner and Albert Warner.
 April 6 – Louis Armstrong makes his first recording, "Chimes Blues", with King Oliver's Creole Jazz Band.
 April 18 – The first Yankee Stadium opens its doors in the Bronx, New York City.
 May 15 – Riegelmann Boardwalk at Coney Island officially opened.
 May 27 – The Ku Klux Klan defies a law requiring publication of its members.

July–September
 July 13 – The Hollywood Sign is inaugurated in California (originally reading Hollywoodland).
 August 2 – Vice President Calvin Coolidge becomes the 30th President of the United States, upon the death of President Warren G. Harding.
 September 3 – Illustrated Daily News first published in Los Angeles by Cornelius Vanderbilt IV.
 September 4 – The United States Navy's first home-built rigid airship USS Shenandoah makes her first flight at Naval Air Station Lakehurst (New Jersey); she contains most of the world's extracted reserves of helium at this time (named and commissioned October 10).
 September 8 – Honda Point Disaster: Seven U.S. Navy destroyers run aground off the California coast.
 September 17 – 1923 Berkeley Fire: Berkeley, California erupts, consuming some 640 structures, including 584 homes in the densely built neighborhoods north of the campus of the University of California.
 September 18–26 – Newspaper printers strike in New York City.
 September 24 – Rowan University opens.
 September 29 – First American Track & Field championships for women, in New Jersey

October–December
 October 1, Mississippi something  Road Signs Act came into effect. 
 October 15 – The New York Yankees defeat the New York Giants (baseball), 4 games to 2, to win their first World Series Title.
 October 16 – Roy and Walt Disney found The Walt Disney Company.
 October 19 – War Resisters League organized by Jessie Wallace Hughan.
 December 10 – Sigma Alpha Kappa (the first social fraternity at a Jesuit college in the United States) is founded at Loyola University New Orleans, making it the first social fraternity at a Jesuit college in the U.S. 
 December 20 – BEGGARS Fraternity (the second social fraternity at a Jesuit college in the United States) is founded by nine men, who have secured permission to do so from the Pope.

Undated
 Soledad C. Chacón takes office as Secretary of State of New Mexico; all subsequent holders of this office through 2011 will also be women.
 The Moderation League of New York becomes part of the movement for the repeal of Prohibition in the U.S.
 Rainbow trout introduced into the upper Firehole River in Yellowstone National Park.

Ongoing
 Lochner era (c. 1897–c. 1937)
 U.S. occupation of Haiti (1915–1934)
 Prohibition (1920–1933)
 Roaring Twenties (1920–1929)

Births 
 January 1 – Daniel Gorenstein, mathematician (died 1992)
 January 16 – Anthony Hecht, poet (died 2004)
 January 29 
Jack Burke, Jr., golfer and coach
Paddy Chayefsky, writer (died 1981)
 January 31 – Norman Mailer, writer (died 2007)
 February 2
James Dickey, poet and author (died 1997)
 Liz Smith, gossip columnist (died 2017)
 February 13
 James Abdnor, U.S. Senator from South Dakota from 1981 to 1987 (died 2012)
 Chuck Yeager, pilot (died 2020)
 February 20 – Helen Murray Free, chemist and educator (died 2021)
 February 28
Jean Carson, actress (died 2005)
 Charles Durning, actor (died 2012)
 March 9
 James L. Buckley, judge and U.S. Senator from New York from 1971 to 1977
 Wayne B. Warrington Sr., Arizona civil servant (died 1989)
 March 10 – Val Logsdon Fitch, nuclear physicist, recipient of the Nobel Prize in Physics (died 2015)
 March 14 – Diane Arbus, photographer (died 1971)
 March 27 – Jack O'Neill, businessman (O'Neill surfwear & equipment) (died 2017)
 April 1
 Leora Dana, actress (died 1983)
 Bobby Jordan, actor (died 1965)
 April 3 – Daniel Hoffman, poet (died 2013)
 April 13  
 Don Adams, actor and director (died 2005)
 Stanley Tanger, businessman and philanthropist, founder of the Tanger Factory Outlet Centers (died 2010)
 April 23 – Walter Pitts, logician and cognitive psychologist (died 1969)
 April 25
 Timothy S. Healy, Jesuit priest and academic administrator (died 1992)
 Albert King, blues guitarist and singer (died 1992)
 May 1 – Joseph Heller, novelist (died 1999)
 May 16 – Merton Miller, economist, recipient of the Nobel Memorial Prize in Economic Sciences (died 2000)
 June 8 – Malcolm Boyd, priest and author (died 2015)
 June 22 – John Oldham, basketball player (died 2020)
 July 13 – Ashley Bryan, children's book writer and illustrator (died 2022)
 July 14 – Robert Zildjian, musical instrument manufacturer (Sabian) (died 2013)
 July 22
 Bob Dole, U.S. Senator from Kansas from 1969 to 1996, Presidential candidate (died 2021)
 The Fabulous Moolah, wrestler (died 2007)
 July 31 – Stephanie Kwolek, polymer chemist (died 2014)
 August 3 – Jean Hagen, actress (died 1977)
 August 10
 Rhonda Fleming, screen actress (died 2020)
 David H. Rodgers, politician (died 2017)
 August 20 – Jim Reeves, country singer (died 1964)
 September 1 – Rocky Marciano, boxer (died 1969)
 September 3
 Glen Bell, entrepreneur, founder of Taco Bell (died 2010)
 Mort Walker, cartoonist, creator of Beetle Bailey (died 2018)
 September 9 – Daniel Carleton Gajdusek, virologist (died 2008)
 September 17 – Hank Williams, country musician (died 1953)
 September 26 – John Ertle Oliver, geophysicist (died 2011)
 October 1 – Babe McCarthy, basketball coach (died 1975)
 October 2 – Hershel W. Williams, Medal of Honour recipient  (died 2022)
 October 4 – Charlton Heston, film actor (died 2008)
 October 20 – Robert Craft, orchestral conductor (died 2015)
 October 23 
 Ned Rorem, composer (died 2022)
 Frank Sutton, actor (died 2022)
 October 27 – Roy Lichtenstein, pop artist (died 1997)
 November 6 – Robert P. Griffin, U.S. Senator from Michigan from 1966 to 1979 (died 2015)
 November 8 – Jack Kilby, electrical engineer, recipient of the Nobel Prize in Physics (died 2005)
 November 9 
 Charles Grier Sellers, historian (died 2021)
 James Schuyler, poet (died 1991)
 November 18 
 Ted Stevens, U.S. Senator from Alaska from 1968 to 2009 (died 2010)
 Alan Shepard, astronaut (died 1998)
 November 23 
 Daniel Brewster, U.S. Senator from Maryland from 1963 to 1969 (died 2007)
 Billy Haughton, harness racer and trainer (died 1986)
 November 26 – Nat Allbright, sports commentator (died 2011)
 December 2 – Maria Callas, singer (died 1977)
 December 10 – Harold Gould, actor (died 2010)
 December 11
 Betsy Blair, film actress (died 2009)
 Lillian Cahn, Hungarian-American businesswoman, co-founder of Coach, Inc. (died 2013)
 December 12 – Bob Barker, game show host (The Price Is Right)
 December 13
 Philip Warren Anderson, physicist, recipient of the Nobel Prize in Physics (died 2020)
 Larry Doby, baseball player (died 2003)
 December 23 – James Stockdale, U.S. Navy admiral and vice presidential candidate (died 2005)
 December 24 – George Patton IV, U.S. Army general (died 2004)
 December 29 – Dina Merrill, actress, heiress, socialite and philanthropist (died 2017)

Deaths 

 January 1 – Willie Keeler, baseball player (born 1872)
 January 18 – Wallace Reid, actor (born 1891)
 February 6 – Edward Emerson Barnard, astronomer (born 1857)
 February 14 – Charles Henry Turner, African American entomologist (born 1867)
 February 24 – Edward W. Morley, scientist (born 1838)
 February 26 
 Walter B. Barrows, naturalist (born 1855)
 George Clement Perkins, U.S. Senator from California from 1893 to 1915 (born 1839)
 March 3 – Melancthon J. Briggs, lawyer and politician (born 1846)
 March 6 – Joseph McDermott, actor (born 1878)
 March 15 – Goat Anderson, baseball player (born 1880)
 April 6 – Alice Cunningham Fletcher, ethnologist and anthropologist (born 1838)
 April 28 – Knute Nelson, Governor of Minnesota from 1893 to 1895 and U.S. Senator from Minnesota from 1895 to 1923 (born 1843 in Norway)
 August 2 – Warren G. Harding, 29th President of the United States from 1921 to 1923 (born 1865)
 August 10 – Laura Redden Searing, deaf poet and journalist (born 1839)
 October 19 – Eleanor Norcross, painter (born 1854)
 October 23 – Hannah Johnston Bailey, temperance advocate and suffragist (born 1839)
 November 11 – Elizabeth Eggleston Seelye, biographer (born 1858)
 November 17 – Mary Bigelow Ingham, author, educator, and religious worker (born 1832)
 December 28 – Frank Hayes, actor (born 1871)

See also
 List of American films of 1923
 Timeline of United States history (1900–1929)

References

External links
 

 
1920s in the United States
United States
United States
Years of the 20th century in the United States